Tapesina is a genus of fungi within the Hyaloscyphaceae family. This is a monotypic genus, containing the single species Tapesina griseovitellina.

References

External links
Tapesina at Index Fungorum

Hyaloscyphaceae
Monotypic Leotiomycetes genera